Berkhout is a village in the northwest Netherlands.

History 
The village was first mentioned around 1312 as Berchout, and means "deciduous forest of birch (Betula) trees". Berkhout developed in the 13th century as a peat excavation village.

The Dutch Reformed church is a T-shaped church in Renaissance Revival style built in 1884. The tower was added in 1886.

Berkhout was home to 766 people in 1840. It was an independent municipality until 1979 when it was merged into Wester-Koggenland. In 2007, it became part of the municipality of Koggenland.

Notable people
Henk Jonker, photographer (1912–2002)

Gallery

Climate

References

Former municipalities of North Holland
Populated places in North Holland
Koggenland